The Wrought Iron Bridge Company was a bridge fabrication and construction company based in Canton, Ohio, United States. It specialized in the fabrication of iron truss bridges and was a prolific bridge builder in the late 19th century. It was one of the 28 firms consolidated by J. P. Morgan into the American Bridge Company in 1900.  Many of its bridges have been listed on the National Register of Historic Places.

Products
The Wrought Iron Bridge Company specialized in relatively short-span iron truss bridges. Most were built for highway use, as the railroads were all privately owned at the time and employed their own engineers. The company supplied a catalog of bridge designs and mass-produced the parts to build these designs. Once a bridge was ordered, the pieces were shipped by train to the nearest station. Thus, local contractors were able to assemble a bridge very quickly, much like a model.

1882 pamphlet

An illustrated pamphlet, dated 1882, is available online. In this pamphlet, Wrought Iron Bridge claims that "during the past 18 years this firm have erected nearly 4,300 spans, varying in length from 20 to 300 feet." At the time of publication, the company had worked in 26 US States, Canada and Mexico.

Wrought Iron Bridge were able to assemble their bridges very quickly and the pamphlet claims that they "have completed 100 to 140 foot spans at points from 100 to 300 miles distant from our works in 8 to 15 days." They were not quite as fast on larger bridges, but the "350 foot bridge, 38 foot wide, built at New Philadelphia, Ohio, was completed for travel in 40 days from the receipt of the contract," a speed unheard of for modern construction, often because of legal red tape.

Surviving bridges
Kern Bridge, in Blue Earth County, Minnesota, 1873
Blackfriars Street Bridge, in London, Ontario, 1875
West Liberty Bridge CR-225, in Morrow County, Ohio, 1876
County Line Bowstring, near Concordia, Kansas, 1876
Maple/Foster Bridge, Barton Hills, Michigan, circa 1876
Poffenberger Road Bridge, near Jefferson, Maryland, 1878
Fourpoints Bridge, near Emmitsburg, Maryland, 1878?
Laughery Creek Bridge, in Dearborn County, Indiana, 1878
Dickey Ford Bridge, in Orange County Indiana, Circa 1880
Lawrence Bridge in Jackson Junction, Iowa, 1880
Hotel Bridge, Leeds, Northampton, Hampshire County, Massachusetts, 1880
Delhi Bridge, Scio Township, Michigan, 1883
Wells Street Bridge, Fort Wayne, Indiana, 1884
Pott's Ford Bridge, in Glasco, Kansas, 1884
Gholson Bridge, in Brunswick County, Virginia, 1884
Chain Lakes Bridge, near Palo, Iowa, 1884
Rome Westernville Road Bridge, Mohawk River, Rome, New York, 1884 
Van Buren Bridge, in Freeport, Illinois, 1885
Nevius Street Bridge, in Raritan/Hillsborough, New Jersey, 1886
Lattice Road Bridge, Hume, New York, 1887 
East Mineral Road Bridge, Erving/Montague, Franklin County, Massachusetts, 1888 

 Tioga Bridge White / Carroll County, Indiana 1890 <

Aetnaville Bridge, in Wheeling, West Virginia, 1891
Rough Holler Bridge, near Hermitage, Missouri, 1891
Masemore Road Bridge, near Baltimore, Maryland, 1898
Linville Creek Bridge, in Broadway, Rockingham County, Virginia, 1898
Gilbert Bridge, near Bowmansdale, Pennsylvania, 1899
Walnut River Bridge, near Douglass, Kansas in Butler County, Kansas, built before 1900
Rockafellows Mill Bridge, Rockefellows Mills, New Jersey, 1900
Springbanks (Renwick Road) Bridge, Plainfield, Illinois, built before 1901
Howell Park Golf Course Bridge in Howell, New Jersey 1899

Gallery

References

Wrought Iron Bridge Co. (1882). Illustrated Pamphlet of Wrought Iron Bridges [Electronic version]. Canton, Ohio. Retrieved July 7, 2009, from Illustrated pamphlet of wrought iron bridges built by Wrought Iron Bridge Company, Canton, Ohio.
Structurae online article: http://en.structurae.de/firms/data/index.cfm?ID=f000652

Construction and civil engineering companies of the United States
Bridge companies
1864 establishments in Ohio
Construction and civil engineering companies established in 1864
American companies established in 1864